Colin Joyce (born August 6, 1994) is an American cyclist, who currently rides for UCI ProTeam .

Major results

2011
 2nd Road race, National Junior Road Championships
2012
 5th Overall Le Trophée Centre Morbihan
 8th Overall Trofeo Karlsberg
2015
 3rd Road race, National Under-23 Road Championships
 3rd Overall GP Liberty Seguros
 5th The Reading 120
 7th La Côte Picarde
2016
 1st Stage 1 (TTT) Olympia's Tour
 4th Overall Tour of Alberta
1st  Young rider classification
1st  Points classification
1st Stage 1
2017
 5th Road race, National Road Championships
 7th Overall Tour of Alberta
2018
 2nd Winston-Salem Cycling Classic
 3rd Overall Arctic Race of Norway
1st Stage 2
 4th Overall Vuelta a Castilla y León
2019
 1st Rutland–Melton CiCLE Classic
2021
 1st Stage 4 Danmark Rundt
2022
 5th Grand Prix Criquielion
2023
 5th Classic Loire Atlantique

References

External links

1994 births
Living people
American male cyclists
People from Pocatello, Idaho
Cyclists from Idaho